Anders Schmidt Hansen (born 31 January 1978) is a Danish professional golfer.

Hansen won his national open in 1999 as an amateur, before turning professional in 2003 at the age of 25. At the end of that year he reached the final stage of the European Tour's Qualifying School, entitling him to play on the second-tier Challenge Tour in 2004. He played thirteen Challenge Tour events in 2004, but recorded only one top-10 finish and ended 108th on the money list. However, this still gained him entry to most Tour events in 2005, and he enjoyed a far more successful year, with a runners-up place at the Galeria Kaufhof Pokal Challenge, and finishing 42nd on the money list. In 2007 he enjoyed his most successful year to date, recording a maiden Challenge Tour win at the MAN NÖ Open and ending 28th on the money list. He has returned to the final stage of Qualifying School a further four times since 2003, but is still yet to earn a card for the full European Tour.

Hansen uses his full name in order to avoid confusion with his fellow Danish golfer, Anders Hansen.

Professional wins (3)

Challenge Tour wins (1)

Challenge Tour playoff record (0–1)

Nordic Golf League wins (2)

Team appearances
Amateur
Eisenhower Trophy (representing Denmark): 2002
Bonallack Trophy (representing Europe): 2002
European Amateur Team Championship  (representing Denmark): 2001, 2003

References

External links

Danish male golfers
European Tour golfers
Sportspeople from the Central Denmark Region
People from Hedensted Municipality
1978 births
Living people